Ana C. Cara is an Argentine creolist, translator, and Professor of Hispanic Studies at Oberlin College.

She graduated from Middlebury College with a Bachelor of Arts in 1972, from University of Pennsylvania with a Master of Arts in Folklore and Folklife in 1974, and with a Doctor of Philosophy in Folklore and Folklife in 1983.
She was visiting scholar at University of California, Berkeley.

Awards
 2007 Willis Barnstone Translation Prize

Works
"The Poetics of Creole Talk: Toward an Aesthetic of Argentine Verbal Art", Journal of American Folklore, Volume 116, Number 459, Winter 2003, pp. 36–56
Baron, Robert, Cara, Ana, "Introduction: Creolization and Folklore", Journal of American Folklore, 2003

References

External links
"Ana Cara", Google Scholar

American folklorists
Women folklorists
Oberlin College faculty
Middlebury College alumni
University of Pennsylvania School of Arts and Sciences alumni
University of California, Berkeley College of Letters and Science faculty
Living people
American translators
American women writers
Year of birth missing (living people)
American women academics
21st-century American women